Keith Walker may refer to:

Sports
Keith Walker (wrestler), American professional wrestler
Keith Walker (footballer), Scottish footballer
Keith Walker (referee), English football referee
Keith Walker (basketball), college basketball head coach for Delaware State University
Keith Walker (cricketer), English cricketer
Keith Walker (baseball) in 1979 College World Series

Others
Keith Walker (writer), American writer, producer, and actor
Keith Walker (cinematographer) on Best Friend Forgotten
Keith Walker (producer) on Midnight Oil (album)